The 2018–19 Wisła Kraków season is the 79th season in the Ekstraklasa and the 65th season in the Polish Cup.

Season review

Sponsors

Transfers

Summer transfer window

Arrivals 
 The following players moved to Wisła.

Departures
 The following players moved from Wisła.

Winter transfer window

Arrivals 
 The following players moved to Wisła.

Departures 

 The following players moved from Wisła.

Coaching staff

Competitions

Preseason  and friendlies

Ekstraklasa

Results summary

Regular season

Relegation round

Results by round

Regular season

Relegation round

Regular season

Relegation round

Polish Cup

Squad and statistics

Appearances, goals and discipline

Goalscorers

Assists

Disciplinary record

Awards

Wisła Player of the Month award

Awarded monthly to the player that was chosen by fans voting on wislaportal.pl

References

Wisła Kraków seasons
Wisla Krakow